Chen Qingmei (born 4 April 1963) is a Chinese long-distance runner. She competed in the women's 3000 metres at the 1988 Summer Olympics.

References

1963 births
Living people
Place of birth missing (living people)
Chinese female long-distance runners
Olympic female long-distance runners
Olympic athletes of China
Athletes (track and field) at the 1988 Summer Olympics
World Athletics Championships athletes for China
Japan Championships in Athletics winners